Death of a Colonial is the sixth historical mystery novel about Sir John Fielding by Bruce Alexander (a pseudonym for Bruce Cook).

Plot summary
A nobleman, last of his line, is executed and the crown prepares to seize his property.  But a claimant to the estate appears, ostensibly from the American colonies, and Sir John is asked to investigate the validity of his claim.

References 

1999 American novels
Sir John Fielding series
American crime novels
American historical novels
G. P. Putnam's Sons books